Gnaphosa mongolica is a ground spider species found from Turkey, Hungary to China.

See also 
 List of Gnaphosidae species

References

External links 

Gnaphosidae
Spiders of Europe
Spiders of Asia
Spiders of China
Arthropods of Turkey
Spiders described in 1895